Edo Benetti (born 2 December 1941) is a former Australian rules football player who played for Richmond Football Club in the Victorian Football League (VFL).

Benetti was recruited from Wonthaggi in the South Gippsland Football League. He was the league's leading goalkicker in 1958 and 1959, played in Wonthaggi's premiership side in 1959 and won the league's best and fairest award in 1959 and 1960.

He played at full-forward and on the half-forward flank for the Tigers, kicking seven goals in his nine-game VFL career.

Benetti returned to Wonthaggi for a season in 1963 then, in 1964, played briefly for Yarraville in the Victorian Football Association before a back injury prematurely ended his playing career.

References
 Hogan P: The Tigers Of Old, Richmond FC, (Melbourne), 1996.

External links

Living people
1941 births
Richmond Football Club players
Yarraville Football Club players
Australian rules footballers from Victoria (Australia)
Australian people of Italian descent